A beaker is a beverage container, typically of non-disposable plastic, or a ceramic cup or mug without a handle, much like a laboratory beaker.

The term beaker is used in parts of the United Kingdom, and particularly commonly to refer to a lidded cup designed for toddlers or small children, with a no-spill mouthpiece incorporated into the lid. In North American English, the term is used almost exclusively in the laboratory context, whereas the drinking vessels are referred to as tumblers.

See also

 Beaker (archaeology)
 Beaker (disambiguation)
 Häufebecher

Drinkware

br:Gob